Marchioness (in Italian marchesa) Marianna Florenzi (1802 – 15 April 1870, in Florence), née Marianna  Bacinetti, was an Italian noblewoman, philosopher and translator of philosophical works. She was also known by her married name of Marianna Florenzi Waddington.

Life
A daughter of count Pietro Bacinetti of Ravenna and countess Laura Rossi di Lugo, she had a literary education and devoted herself to reading philosophical works, becoming the female ideal of an educated woman of the time and a witty hostess of cultural gatherings and salons. She was one of the first female students, studying natural sciences at the University of Perugia in the first half of the 19th century. She translated Leibniz's Monadology into Italian and also promoted the spread of works by Kant, Spinoza and Schelling in Italian. Politically she supported Italy's national-movement and in 1850 published Some reflections on socialism and communism, which (like many of her other works) ended up on the church's Index Librorum Prohibitorum.  She was for forty years a lover and close friend of Ludwig I of Bavaria, whom she visited more than thirty times. He always sought her advice, even in government matters, and 3,000 of her letters to him (along with 1,500 of his replies) survive.

Marriages
in 1819, to marchese Ettore Florenzi in Perugia
May 7, 1836 to the Englishman Evelyn Waddington in Florence.

Bibliography 
 Jean Delisle (ed.): Portraits de traductrices. Ottawa, Les Presses de l’Université d’Ottawa, coll. "Regards sur la traduction" / Arras, Artois Presses Université, coll. "Traductologie", 2002. VIII + 408 Seiten, (franz.)

External links 

monumente online: Bayerns Könige Teil II: Ludwig I. – Künstler, Charmeur und Monarch

1802 births
1870 deaths
University of Perugia alumni
Italian philosophers
Italian translators
Translators from German
Italian salon-holders
19th-century Italian nobility
Political science writers
People from Ravenna
Translators to Italian
19th-century translators
19th-century Italian women writers
Women political writers
19th-century philosophers
19th-century Italian writers